The canton of Bourg-en-Bresse-1 is an administrative division of the Ain department, in eastern France. It was created at the French canton reorganisation which came into effect in March 2015. Its seat is in Bourg-en-Bresse.

It consists of the following communes:
Bourg-en-Bresse (partly)
Viriat

References

Cantons of Ain